{{DISPLAYTITLE:NZR WAB class}}

The NZR WAB class locomotives were steam locomotives designed, built and used by New Zealand Railways Department (NZR). Their wheel arrangement is described by the Whyte notation 4-6-4T. The locomotives were designed by NZR chief draughtsman S.H. Jenkinson as tank versions of the AB class 4-6-2 Pacific locomotive. Initially, the locomotives were separated into two classes, designated WAB for mainline work and WS for suburban work.

The remaining locomotives were kept in service until the last days of steam, operating short-haul mainline freight services and fast suburban services, particularly in Auckland. WAB 794 was sold to the Ohai Railway Board in Southland for running heavy coal trains. The locomotives were progressively withdrawn in the 1960s.

Introduction 
The first locomotives, WS 686 and WAB 687, were built from the boilers, frames and engine units initially destined for AB 666 and AB 667. These entered service in 1917, WS 686 in Wellington and WAB 687 at Taumarunui in the central North Island. Fourteen WS class locomotives were built between 1917 and 1925: one at Addington workshops (686), five at A & G Price Ltd, Thames (799-803) and eight at Hillside workshops, Dunedin (764-771). All the WS class were converted to WAB in 1932-4. Sixteen WAB class were built between 1918 and 1926: one at Addington (687), 12 at Hillside (786-795) and three at A&G Price (796-798). In about 1922 the class was introduced on Auckland (until 1930 near Britomart) to Papakura suburban services. Between 1947 and 1957 11 WAB class were converted to AB class.

Preserved locomotives
Only three examples of the class remain, with two in their original form as WABs:

WAB 794 was donated by the Ohai Railway Board in 1968 to the New Zealand Railway and Locomotive Society and was moved to the Ferrymead Railway, and displayed for the Rail 125 celebrations in 1988. The locomotive has since been restored and is preserved at Feilding, and has been used on mainline excursions and also on the regular Wellington - Auckland Overlander service.
WAB (former WS) 800 is owned by the Waikato Branch of New Zealand Railway and Locomotive Society and was stored for many years at the Te Awamutu Railway Museum. Following the negotiation of a lease agreement, the engine has been moved to the Glenbrook Vintage Railway for eventual restoration to working order.
AB (former WAB) 795 is preserved at Kingston, for use on the "Kingston Flyer".

See also
 NZR W class
 NZR WA class
 NZR WB class
 NZR WD class
 NZR WE class
 NZR WF class
 NZR WG class
 NZR WW class
 Locomotives of New Zealand

References

Citations

Bibliography

External links

 NZ Steam locomotives - WAB class
 Feilding and District Steam Rail Society
 Railway preservation in New Zealand

Wab class
4-6-4T locomotives
3 ft 6 in gauge locomotives of New Zealand
Railway locomotives introduced in 1917